Beseda was a clandestine discussion circle in the Russian Empire.

Beseda may also refer to:
 Beseda (Macedonian magazine)
 Beseda (Russian magazine)
 Beseda (surname)
 Sergey Beseda (born 1954), Russian politician

See also